The New Salem Covered Bridge, near Commerce, Georgia, is a multiple kingpost truss covered bridge built in 1915.  It was listed on the National Register of Historic Places in 1975.

By 1974 it had been bypassed by a modern concrete bridge, so it is no longer used.

References

Covered bridges in Georgia (U.S. state)
National Register of Historic Places in Banks County, Georgia
Bridges completed in 1915
Truss bridges in the United States